Derephysia is a genus of lace bugs in the family Tingidae. There are more than 20 described species in Derephysia.

Species
These 23 species belong to the genus Derephysia:

 Derephysia brevicornis Reuter, 1888
 Derephysia bucharensis Josifov, 1969
 Derephysia cristata (Panzer, 1806)
 Derephysia emmanueli Ribes, 1967
 Derephysia foliacea (Fallen, 1807) (foliaceous lace bug)
 Derephysia fujisana Takeya, 1962
 Derephysia gardneri Drake & Poor, 1936
 Derephysia garneri Drake & Poor, 1936
 Derephysia gracilicornis Josifov, 1969
 Derephysia josefa Baena & Torres, 2009
 Derephysia kiritshenkoi Josifov, 1970
 Derephysia longirostrata Jing, 1980
 Derephysia longispina Golub, 1974
 Derephysia lugens Horváth, 1902
 Derephysia minuta Josifov, 1969
 Derephysia nigricosta Horvath, 1905
 Derephysia ovata Takeya, 1962
 Derephysia penalveri Golub & Popov, 2000
 Derephysia rectinervis Puton, 1887
 Derephysia sinuaticollis Puton, 1879
 Derephysia sinuatocollis Puton, 1879
 Derephysia tibetensia Jing, 1981
 Derephysia tyche Wappler, 2004

References

Further reading

External links

 

Tingidae
Articles created by Qbugbot